The 2019 FIA Junior World Rally Championship was the eighteenth season of the Junior World Rally Championship, an auto racing championship recognised by the Fédération Internationale de l'Automobile, running in support of the World Rally Championship.

The Junior World Rally Championship was open to drivers under the age of thirty—although no such restriction existed for co-drivers—competing in identical one-litre Ford Fiesta R2s built and maintained by M-Sport. The championship was contested over five selected WRC rounds with the winning crew awarded a new Ford Fiesta R5 car, tyre package, free fuel and a registration to compete in the 2020 World Rally Championship-3.

Jan Solans and Mauro Barreiro won the drivers' and co-drivers' championships, beating Tom Kristensson and Henrik Appelskog by eighteen points. In the Trophy of Nations, Sweden beat Spain by six point to become the inaugural winners.

Calendar
The final 2019 Junior World Rally Championship calendar consisted of five events, taken from the 2019 World Rally Championship.

Calendar changes
The 2019 calendar was heavily revised from the 2018 schedule. The championship dropped from six rounds to five. The Rallies of Portugal and Turkey were removed from the calendar, while events in Italy and Wales were added in their place.

Route changes
Organisers of the Tour de Corse announced plans for a new route, with up to three-quarters of the 2019 route being revised from the 2018 rally.

Entries
The following crews were entered into the championship:

Changes
All teams competed with an identical car built by M-Sport. The team announced that a new model of Ford Fiesta was introduced for 2019, one that was still built to R2 specifications, but featured a new engine and drivetrain. The new engine package was capable of producing  of power, up from the  produced by the engine used in 2018.

Crews were no longer eligible to score points in the World Rally Championship-3 as the series was discontinued in 2019.

Results and standings

Season summary

Scoring system
Points are awarded to the top ten classified finishers. An additional point is given for every stage win. The best 4 classification results count towards the drivers’ and co-drivers’ totals, but stage points from all 5 rounds can be retained. Classification points for the last event are doubled for the drivers’ and co-drivers’ championship, but only if they have started at least 3 of the previous Junior WRC rounds.  For the FIA Junior WRC Trophy of Nations, only the highest-placed driver from each event received points for their nation.

FIA Junior World Rally Championship for Drivers

FIA Junior World Rally Championship for Co-Drivers

FIA Junior World Rally Championship Trophy for Nations

Notes

References

External links
 

Junior World Rally